Thomas Wesley Forrest (born April 11, 1952) is a former American football offensive guard who played in the National Football League (NFL) for one season. He played college football at Cincinnati and was drafted by the San Diego Chargers in the eighth round of the 1974 NFL Draft.

Professional career

New York Stars
Forrest was selected in the tenth round of the 1974 World Football League Draft in January by the New York Stars, but didn't play for the team.

San Diego Chargers
Forrest was selected by the San Diego Chargers in the eighth round of the 1974 NFL Draft in April, but he never saw action as a member of the team.

Chicago Bears
Forrest played in eight games with the Chicago Bears during the 1974 season.

Chicago Winds
Forrest played one game with the WFL's Chicago Winds in the 1975 season.

References

External links
 Pro Football Archives bio

1952 births
Living people
Players of American football from Washington, D.C.
American football offensive guards
Cincinnati Bearcats football players
Chicago Bears players
Chicago Winds players
People from Washington, D.C.